Henry M. Milner was a 19th-century British playwright and author of melodramas and popular tragedies.  Milner wrote numerous plays, including two popular equestrian dramas/hippodramas featuring live horses on stage. These are: Mazeppa; or, the Wild Horse of Tartary (which was based on Lord Byron's 1819 poem), which kicked off a wave of interest in the legend and Dick Turpin's Ride to York; or, Bonny black Bess, about the famous highwayman and his horse. Both of these plays included great spectacle in performance and enjoyed great popular success during the mid to late nineteenth century. ' 'Mazeppa' ' was extremely popular and often produced; it is recalled as one of, if not the most, significant and popular equestrian drama of all time.

Another of Milner's noteworthy and successful works is, The Man and The Monster; or The Fate of Frankenstein, with O. Smith as The Monster and which opened on 3 July 1826 at the Royal Coburg Theatre (now known as The Old Vic), eight years after Mary Shelley's Frankenstein was published. subsequent film adaptations follow Milner's example, in making Frankenstein's monstrous creation a pivotal scene.

See also
Dick Turpin's Ride to York, 1922 film

Partial list of works

 
 
   (See Cultural legacy of Mazeppa#The 1830s-1860s)

References

External links
 "Frankenstein: or The Man and the Monster." A Romantic Melo-Drama, in Two Acts. FOUNDED PRINCIPALLY ON MRS. SHELLEY'S SINGULAR WORK ENTITLED "FRANKENSTEIN; OR, THE MODERN PROMETHEUS" And partly on the French piece, "Le Magicien et le Monstre."- at University of Pennsylvania

British dramatists and playwrights
Year of birth missing
Year of death missing
British male dramatists and playwrights